David Aufhauser served as the General Counsel of the United States Treasury Department from 2001 to 2004. After 9/11, Aufhauser was a key player in disrupting and freezing further terrorist activity against the United States. He is best known for running the federal government's programs to go after terrorist financing, a major strategy in the war on terror. He ran the National Security Council Committee on Terrorist Financing; oversaw the legal departments of important agencies and divisions within the U.S. Treasury Department including International Banking, Domestic Banking, the U.S. Customs Service, IRS criminal and civil divisions, ATF, Financial Crimes and Money Laundering, and United States Secret Service; and supervised the federal government's multi-agency antiterrorism task force. In his numerous briefings before the House and Senate, he emphasized the importance of teaching tolerance and respect, often making clear distinctions between the vast majority of peaceful people in the Middle East and the practitioners of “counterfeit religion” who preyed on hopelessness to recruit terrorists.

He began his career in 1977 at the law firm of Williams & Connolly. After completing his government service, he worked in investment banking and returned to Williams & Connolly in 2008.

In 2010 and 2011, he was named as one of Washington's best attorneys.

Career overview 
Aufhauser practiced law at the Williams & Connolly law firm from 1977 to 2001. In 2001, he was appointed by President George W. Bush and confirmed by the U.S. Senate to serve as general counsel in the United States Department of the Treasury.

After September 11, 2001, Aufhauser ran the National Security Council Committee on Terrorist Financing. He supervised the federal government's multi-agency antiterrorism task force.

Between 2004 and 2008, he worked at UBS investment bank. Currently, Aufhauser is a partner at William & Connolly LLP, a Washington, D.C. law firm. He specializes in litigation, arbitration, and government investigations.

General Counsel, U.S. Treasury Department 
During his tenure as the Treasury Department's general counsel, Aufhauser oversaw the legal departments of the IRS, U.S. Bureau of Customs, Secret Service, ATF, U.S. Mint, Financial Crimes Enforcement Network, the Office of Foreign Asset Controls, and several of the department's divisions including International Affairs, Domestic Banking and Finance, and Enforcement.

He led the team that implemented the sections of the Patriot Act run by the Treasury Department. He also led the team that implemented economic sanctions.

Additionally, he ran other programs related to the reconstruction of Afghanistan and Iraq, money laundering, China currency issues, tax reform, and sovereign debt restructuring.

Following the Enron crisis, President Bush appointed a Department of Justice task force on corporate fraud and abuse. Aufhauser served on the panel as Treasury's representative.

Work against terrorist financing 
In Ron Suskind's book, The One Percent Doctrine, Suskind describes the acute difference between the public perception and the reality behind the use of the White House Situation Room:“The Situation Room – that rectangle of wood paneling and dropdown screens in the White House basement – has recently matched the Oval Office as most storied chamber of the US government. In an odd turn of the media age, this tiny square of carpeted real estate has seized the public’s imagination. … On balance though, little actually get done there….For problem solving and action plans, anxious public servants will, time and again, by pass the Situation Room for its small adjacent conference room – a place where real work gets done." Beginning in October 2001, a half dozen or so key officials met each Wednesday morning in the Situation Room's conference room. Aufhauser managed the group. Suskind writes, “David Aufhauser, an elegant Washington lawyer . . . coordinated the government’s overall ‘financial war.’” Officials from the National Security Council, Central Intelligence Agency, and National Security Agency (NSA) met under Aufhauser’s command. The group’s mission was to figure out how money flowed around the globe to Al-Qaeda, and how to stop that flow.

On June 15, 2004, Aufhauser testified before a hearing of the U.S. Senate Committee on Governmental Affairs, “An Assessment of Current Efforts to Combat Terrorism Financing.” In his testimony, he didn't mince words when describing Osama bin Laden, who he called a “hapless businessman” whose “ventures failed and were not the principal source of al Qaeda’s wealth.” In explaining bin Laden's rise to leadership, Aufhauser testified, “In doing so, bin Laden managed to leverage the tactic of terror into a malevolent dogma embraced by an army of madmen.”

In his testimony, Aufhauser pushed hard for what he believed was the best strategy to fight terrorism: stop the funding of terrorism in order to “scale back the violence [and] to deplete the resources made available to kill innocent people.” During the hearing (which was held in 2004), he declared that Al Qaeda was more lethal than it was on 9/11.

Shortly after U.S. military forces removed Saddam Hussein from power at the start of the Iraq War, Aufhauser testified before the U.S. House Financial Services Subcommittee on Oversight and Investigations. In his testimony, Aufhauser advocated a policy to give back Iraq's wealth to the Iraqi people: Iraqi oil, $1.7 billion in Iraqi assets invested in the U.S., $2.3 billion in frozen assets held in other foreign countries, assets that had been stolen from the Iraq Central Bank, and a donor fund from the international community. He told the committee, “Whatever unfound money there is, ought to be returned to feed people.”

Terrorism’s three currencies 
As an official at the Treasury Department, Aufhauser coined a phrase that represented the root causes of terrorism – terrorism's “three currencies.” The three currencies are hate, counterfeit religion, and money. He believed that a hopeless environment in many areas within the Middle East created hate and counterfeit religion that fueled terrorist zealousness. However, one of the primary purposes of his role in the War on Terrorism was to go after terror financing.

Aufhauser believed that a cash-rich terrorist cell would be difficult to stop. However, if forces could prevent the cell from obtaining finances in the first place, it would greatly diminish the threat.

Reverse money laundering 

In the book Targeting Terrorist Financing: International Cooperation and New Regimes, author Arabinda Acharya offers a contrast between terrorist financing and traditional money laundering. While traditional money laundering is the act of turning criminally-obtained currency into clean-looking money, the reverse is true in terrorist financing; terrorists obtain legitimate-looking funding and then use it to conduct criminal acts. Acharya referred to this as “reverse money laundering.” Aufhauser agreed; using traditional money laundering law enforcement tools to go after terrorist financing was a losing battle. Acharya writes, “Thus as David Aufhauser, former General Counsel of the US Treasury puts it, using anti-money laundering tools to target terrorist financing is like “looking at the world of [terrorist financing] from the wrong end of the telescope.’”

Office of Foreign Assets Control (OFAC) 
The Office of Foreign Assets Control (OFAC) had a little more than one hundred employees after 9/11. The office was not well understood by the public, but was powerful. One of OFAC's responsibilities was to administer the United States' economic sanctions programs. In 1986, OFAC issued its first list of "Specially Designated Nationals." People on the list were generally barred from participating in America's banking system. After 9/11, OFAC used its legal sanctions powers to freeze and seize Al Qaeda's finances. However, before OFAC could do so, it needed authority from the President of the United States.

Aufhauser and a small group of attorneys from Treasury and OFAC drafted the executive order they needed to go after Al Qaeda. Prior to 9/11, OFAC was legally restricted to pursue terrorist financing; it had to go after very specifically-designated terrorist organizations. Aufhauser and his colleagues drafted the executive order to give OFAC broad authority to go after terrorism at large. People and organizations subject to the new authority included financial supporters of terrorist organizations, the businesses owned by them, and anyone associated with them.

Elections law 
In the November 2000 Florida presidential election legal battles, Aufhauser supervised the Republican Party's effort to have overseas military ballots counted. The ballots were cast on time, but received from theaters of conflict, such as Bosnia, too late for the November 4 count. Aufhauser prevailed on the legal arguments, the votes were opened, and the overwhelming majority elected Bush as president.

Education 
Aufhauser earned his AB from Wesleyan University, MBA from Harvard University, and JD from the University of Pennsylvania Law School.

He was a guest lecturer at Harvard Law School, the University of Chicago, University of Pennsylvania and Georgetown University, MIT, and Johns Hopkins University.

Awards 
The Treasury Department awarded Aufhauser the Alexander Hamilton Award. The award is the highest award that the Treasury Department gives. The FBI, CIA, Secret Service, and State Department also gave awards to Aufhauser for his service.

Boards 
Aufhauser was a senior adviser to the Center for Strategic and International Studies (CSIS). In his role, he helped CSIS develop policy plans to curb terrorist financing.

He is a trustee, advisor and board member to a number of organizations including the Atlantic Council, the Council on Foreign Relations, St. Albans School of Public Service, and the National Intelligence Council’s Global Markets Advisory Board.

Personal 
Aufhauser was raised in Stony Brook, New York. He was born in New York City.

Aufhauser has three children. During his confirmation hearing before the Senate Committee on Finance, Aufhauser made the room laugh when he joked that his daughter had recently been elected president of her seventh grade class, only to learn that they have term limits.

References

External links 
 David Aufhauser – C-SPAN videos
 Economic Warfare Super Panel – YouTube video
 Is the U.S. Legal Regime Undermining American Competitiveness? - Event Audio/Video, The Federalist Society, 2007 National Lawyers Convention, November 15, 2007, with guest speaker David Aufhauser
 David D. Aufhauser - Lawyer Profile on Martindale
 Official picture – Getty Images

Published works 
 
 
 

Year of birth missing (living people)
Living people
Harvard Business School alumni
United States Department of the Treasury officials
University of Pennsylvania Law School alumni
Wesleyan University alumni
Williams & Connolly people